Bosara longipecten is a moth in the family Geometridae. It is found on Borneo. The habitat consists of areas at altitudes between 1,500 and 2,600 meters.

The length of the forewings is 7–8 mm.

References

Moths described in 1997
Eupitheciini
Moths of Indonesia